Cheyney may refer to:

Places
Cheyney, Pennsylvania, U.S.
Cheyney University of Pennsylvania, American university
Cheyney Court, Manydown, Hampshire, England

People with the surname
George W. Cheyney (1854–1903), American businessman and politician
Peter Cheyney (1896–1951), British writer
Richard Cheyney (1513–1578), English bishop

See also
Cheney (disambiguation)